Barchi is a frazione of the comune of Terre Rovereschea  in the Province of Pesaro e Urbino in the Italian region Marche, located about 45 km west of Ancona and about 30 km south of Pesaro. It was a separate comune until 2017.

References

Former municipalities of the Marche